Corrina, Corrina is a 1994 American comedy-drama film set in 1959 about a widower (Ray Liotta) who hires a housekeeper/nanny (Whoopi Goldberg) to care for his daughter (Tina Majorino). It was written and directed by Jessie Nelson, in her feature film directing debut. It was the final film in which Don Ameche starred; he died shortly after filming was completed.

Plot
In late 1950s Los Angeles, a quiet pot-luck wake is held for Annie Singer (Lynette Walden), who has died and left husband Manny (Ray Liotta) and daughter Molly (Tina Majorino). Manny's mother Eva (Erica Yohn) and father Harry (Don Ameche) and the other guests all leave and it is apparent that Manny is in for difficulty. Molly will refuses to speak due to the death of her mother , and there is a need for a housekeeper/nanny so that Manny can return to his shaky job writing commercial jingles for his best friend and boss, Sid (Larry Miller).

After one nanny washes out, Corrina Washington (Whoopi Goldberg) interviews for the position. Molly responds well to Corrina and Manny hires her. Very quickly a strong bond is formed between them. Corrina works out a system to "talk" with Molly without making her speak. Corrina sees the early struggles of life after Annie's passing, and Molly slowly begins to interact more with Corrina. Molly also begins to spend time with Corrina's family, who take her to church and welcome her into their home. At an office party, Manny is introduced to Jenny (Wendy Crewson), a perky  divorcee with two young sons. Manny is still struggling with losing Annie and is not ready to date. Corrina's sister Jevina encourages her to date a black man, Anthony, but Corrina isn't interested.

A frightened Molly returns to school where she is bullied for adding Corrina to her family picture. She runs into Corrina's arms at the end of the day, desperate to go home. That night, Molly awakes from a nightmare, Corrina and Manny run to her side but she is scared and angry. Corrina tells her she is allowed to be mad. Manny admits to her how hurt he is about losing Annie and how much he misses her too. That night Jevina chastises Corrina for pretending to become a part of this family.

A terrified Molly begs Corrina to let her stay home from school and she secretly agrees. Corrina spends more time with them, and soon she & Manny slowly discover they are more compatible with each other than with anyone else. He confides in her about Annie and she talks about her long gone former husband. They share a love of music and she even assists him on his new jingle. After a successful advertising campaign, he comes home with flowers for Molly as well as Corrina. Their private celebration is interrupted by a visit from Jenny, which Corrina takes as a cue that she is not meant to stay.

The next day, a flustered Corrina goes to work where Manny apologizes for Jenny's uninvited visit. As they say goodbye, they share a kiss on the cheek, which Manny's nosey neighbor sees. Corrina and Manny begin to fall in love and face prejudice as an interracial couple. Molly asks her grandfather Harry to make sure that Manny marries Corrina. That night, Corrina and Manny talk about their spouses and share a moonlight dance and kiss that is witnessed by Molly.

After weeks of playing hooky from school, Corrina tells Molly it's almost time for her to return, but Molly says she's not yet ready. Soon after, Manny finds out that Corrina has been letting Molly stay home from  school. In a fit of anger, he tells her that she is not Molly's mother and fires her, taking a heartbroken Molly home. Molly becomes withdrawn again, and Manny learns that Harry has died. After the funeral, he goes to visit Corrina at her house to tell her of Harry's passing and to properly apologize. After an unsuccessful talk, she overhears his not-so quiet prayers to God to help him out. She informs him that she quit and he assures her that she was replaced. They embrace and he begins to kiss her. She brings him inside to formally meet her family. Finally, Molly singing "This Little Light of Mine" in order to cheer up Eva, and eventually Eva joins  the joyful song. Soon Manny and Corrina returns and Molly joyfully runs to Corrina.

Cast
 Whoopi Goldberg as Corrina Washington
 Ray Liotta as Manny Singer
 Tina Majorino as Molly Singer
 Joan Cusack as Jonesy
 Wendy Crewson as Jenny Davis
 Jenifer Lewis as Jevina Washington
 Don Ameche as Harry Singer
 Larry Miller as Sid
 Brent Spiner as Brent Witherspoon
 Erica Yohn as Eva Singer 
 Lynette Walden as Annie Singer
 Patrika Darbo as Wilma the Car Hop

Release
The film was not a box office success, grossing $20,160,000 in the U.S.

Reception
The film received mixed reviews from many film critics criticizing Nelson's failure to fully address the complications surrounding a romantic interracial relationship in the 1950s. Roger Ebert confessed that he enjoyed it but wrote:  Janet Maslin of The New York Times praised the actors and actresses for their work on it but echoed a similar criticism regarding Manny and Corrina's relationship:  On Rotten Tomatoes it holds a 37% rating based on 19 reviews.

Year-end lists
 Honorable mention – John Hurley, Staten Island Advance

References

External links
 
 
 
 

1994 directorial debut films
1994 films
1994 romantic drama films
American romantic drama films
Films directed by Jessie Nelson
Films about Jews and Judaism
Films set in 1959
Films set in Los Angeles
Films about nannies
New Line Cinema films
Films about interracial romance
Fiction about child care occupations
Films about father–daughter relationships
1990s English-language films
1990s American films